Jason Wilk is an American entrepreneur and the founder and CEO of Dave, a publicly traded financial services company on NASDAQ. He grew up in Los Angeles, California. Wilk created several small businesses before selling a video advertising network called AllScreen for $85 million in 2015. That gave him the money to start Dave, a digital banking upstart that works off of tips and subscription fees rather than overdraft fees. Over the years, Dave has grown to more than 10 million users and went public in January, 2022 at a valuation close to $4 billon.

Early life
Wilk was born in Los Angeles, California, where he also spent his youth. He attended Loyola Marymount University in California, where he played golf. Initially, Wilk wanted to be a professional golfer, but at college decided to pursue entrepreneurship instead. He graduated from Loyola Maymount in 2007.

Career

Early career
Wilk's first business venture was a retail website for golf equipment called 1DaySports.com. He sold the website for $100,000 and used the money for a backpacking trip across several continents. Wilk also founded a startup called AllScreen. It was funded by Y Combinator. AllScreen was a video distribution network for media companies to easily share their content and ad revenue with other websites to achieve more views . The company was also backed by celebrity venture capitalist Mark Cuban. Mr. Cuban invested in several of Wilk's ventures and had a big impact on Wilk's career after they met at the TechCrunch 40 conference around 2010. While AllScreen was still in stealth mode, he cofounded a company called WriteyBoard that sold stick-in whiteboards to startup companies. AllScreen sold to Zealot Networks in 2015 for $85 million.

Dave
Wilk founded digital banking upstart, Dave, with co-founders Paras Chitrakar and John Wolanin in 2016. The startup was inspired by Wilk's prior frustration with overdraft fees  According to Wilk, he had more than 120 meetings with venture capitalists, attempting to get financial support for Dave from investors that do not themselves experience overdraft fees. Dave grew to 10 million members within 5 years and $122 million in annual revenues by 2020, using subscriptions and optional tips as its business model, instead of overdraft fees. Wilk is largely credited with the disruption of overdraft fees in American banking. In 2022, Wilk was asked to give a Congressional testimony in front of the Senate Banking Subcommittee for Financial Institutions and Consumer Protection on the topic of “Examining Overdraft Fees and Their Effects on Working
Families”. In 2021, Dave was ranked the fifth fastest growing company in America on the Inc5000 list. In January 2022, Wilk took the company public on NASDAQ at a valuation of close to $4 billion.

Personal life

Wilk lives in Los Angeles, California with his wife, Briana.

Awards And Honors

2020 EY Entrepreneur of the year, Los Angeles 
Dave ranked fifth fastest growing company on INC 5000 List 2021 
AllScreen ranked 29th fastest growing company on INC 5000 List 2015

References

Notes

External links
 Podcast interview with Wilk

Businesspeople from Los Angeles
American financial company founders
Loyola Law School alumni
Loyola Marymount Lions athletes
Living people
1985 births